Jahn Ivar Jakobsen, nicknamed Mini, (born 8 November 1965 in Gravdal) is a Norwegian former football player (winger/forward) who has played for, amongst others, Bodø/Glimt and Rosenborg.

Club career
During the very early years of his career, Jakobsen played at Junkeren and Grand Bodø, two minor Norwegian clubs in the town of Bodø. Mini's actual professional career as a footballer started at the well-known Norwegian club Bodø/Glimt. When he arrived at the club, Bodø/Glimt played in the third division (the third highest division in Norway at the time), but did gain promotion in 1986. In the Norwegian second division, Bodø/Glimt finished in seventh place in 1987. At Bodø/Glimt, Jakobsen was the top scorer for four consecutive seasons: In 1984, with seven goals (third division), in 1985 with 18 goals (third), in 1986 with 26 goals (third) and in 1987 with 16 goals (second division).

In 1988, Jakobsen was transferred to Rosenborg along with teammate Ørjan Berg, and after a successful season – winning the Norwegian double and becoming the league's top scorer – he got his first cap for Norway. At Rosenborg he became well known as a high quality winger/striker.

After the Norwegian 1990 season, Jakobsen was transferred from Rosenborg to the Swiss club BSC Young Boys, and during the next four years hr played for several different European clubs in Switzerland, Germany and Belgium.

In 1994, Jakobsen returned to Rosenborg, and became a part of Rosenborg's better than expected performances in UEFA Champions League tournament. He then played for Norway in the 1998 World Cup, where they made the second round.

Jakobsen successfully ended his professional career at Rosenborg by winning the Norwegian double in 1999. He is now working as a sports reporter at the Norwegian TV channel TV 2.

Personal life
In his youth, Jakobsen changed his name from Jan Ivar to Jahn Ivar. He later stated that he changed his name because his idol, Norwegian singer Jahn Teigen, wrote his first name with an h.

Career statistics

Honours

Club
Rosenborg
 Norwegian top division: 1988, 1990, 1995, 1996, 1997, 1998, 1999
 Norwegian Cup: 1988, 1990, 1995, 1999

Individual
 Norwegian top division top scorer: 1989

References

Kniksen Award winners
1965 births
Living people
Norwegian expatriate footballers
Expatriate footballers in Germany
Expatriate footballers in Switzerland
Expatriate footballers in Belgium
Norwegian footballers
Norway international footballers
Norwegian expatriate sportspeople in Germany
Eliteserien players
Belgian Pro League players
Bundesliga players
Swiss Super League players
FK Bodø/Glimt players
Rosenborg BK players
BSC Young Boys players
MSV Duisburg players
Lierse S.K. players
Sportspeople from Bodø
1994 FIFA World Cup players
1998 FIFA World Cup players
Norwegian association football commentators
Association football wingers
Association football forwards